Dziesięciny II is one of the districts of the Polish city of Białystok.

External links 

Districts of Białystok